Griswold High School is the only public secondary school in Griswold, Connecticut, for grades 9 to 12. In addition to students promoted from Griswold Middle School, the school also enrolls students from the nearby towns of Canterbury, Franklin, Lisbon, Norwich, Preston, Sprague, and Voluntown. Griswold High School is part of Griswold Public Schools, supported by the Griswold Board of Education.

The original Griswold High School was constructed in 1936, and now serves as Griswold Middle School. The new Griswold High School was built in 1992 adjacent to the original School, and shares Griswold Public Schools' 70-acre campus along the Quinebaug River in northern New London County. Griswold High School's state-of-the-art facility features various labs for STEM programs (Sciences, Engineering, Manufacturing, Medical, Culinary, and an advanced-technology Nexus Lab for Computer-Aided Drafting and Design, Animation, coding, and esports), spacious classrooms, a modern Learning Commons library media center, a 600-seat auditorium and musical rehearsal spaces, a gymnasium, print-shop, athletic fields, nature trails, and more.

Griswold supplies Chromebooks for every student.

Facilities within Griswold High School are available for community use outside of school hours.

Athletics 
Griswold High School became a member of the Eastern Connecticut Conference (ECC) in 2000, when it merged with serval schools from the Quinebaug Valley Conference (QVC). The Griswold sports teams are known as the Wolverines and compete in:

 American Football
 State champions: 1964, 1974
 Baseball
 CIAC state champions: 1969, 1970, 1974, 1975, 1978, 1981 (Class S)
 Basketball (boys & girls)
 Cross Country (boys & girls)
 Boys state champions: 1990, 1991, 1995, 1996, 1998, 2000, 2001, 2002, 2003, 2004, 2005, 2006, 2007, 2022
 Girls state champions: 2002, 2004, 2006, 2007, 2010, 2012
 Fencing - foil and épée (co-ed)
 Golf (co-ed)
 Lacrosse (boys co-op with Ledyard High School & girls)
 Soccer (boys & girls)
 Softball
 State champions: 2003 (Class M)
 Indoor Track & Field (boys & girls)
 Boys state champions: 1951, 2003, 2006
 Outdoor Track & Field (boys & girls)
 Boys state champions: 1946, 2004, 2005, 2006
 Volleyball (girls)
 Wrestling (co-ed)
 State champions: 2006, 2007, 2011
 Cheerleading

Griswold High School's football rivalry with Plainfield High School dates back to 1937; the Thanksgiving Day game tradition began in 1966.

Notable alumni

 Sean Brackett (2009), Arena Football League quarterback
 Calvin Coffey (1969), Olympic Medalist
 Bill Dawley, former MLB pitcher
 Roger LaFrancois, former MLB catcher

References

External links
 
 Official Griswold Public Schools website

Schools in New London County, Connecticut
Public high schools in Connecticut
Griswold, Connecticut
1938 establishments in Connecticut
Educational institutions established in 1938